Tom DeMaio is a former American football coach.  He served as the head football coach at William Paterson University in Wayne Township, New Jersey, one year, 1988, compiling a record of 3–7.

Head coaching record

References

Year of birth missing (living people)
Living people
William Paterson Pioneers football coaches